Kim Jin-a (born 20 August 1996) is a North Korean judoka.

She won the gold medal in the girls' 52 kg event at the 2013 Asian Youth Games held in Nanjing, China.

She participated at the 2018 World Judo Championships, winning a medal.

In 2019, she won the gold medal in the women's 57 kg event at the 2019 Judo World Masters held in Qingdao, China.

References

External links
 

1996 births
Living people
North Korean female judoka
Judoka at the 2018 Asian Games
Asian Games silver medalists for North Korea
Asian Games medalists in judo
Medalists at the 2018 Asian Games
21st-century North Korean women